Natalie Louise Bennett, Baroness Bennett of Manor Castle (born 10 February 1966) is an Australian-British politician and journalist who served as Leader of the Green Party of England and Wales from 2012 to 2016. Bennett was given a peerage in Theresa May's 2019 resignation honours.

Born and raised in Australia, she began her career as a journalist with regional newspapers in New South Wales before leaving in 1995 for Thailand, where she worked for Australian Volunteers International and the Bangkok Post newspaper over the next four years. Since settling in Britain in 1999 she has contributed to The Guardian, The Independent, and The Times. Her election as leader of the Greens came six years after she joined the party in January 2006.

Early life
Bennett was born on 10 February 1966 in Eastwood, a suburb of Sydney, Australia, the daughter of John and Joy Bennett. She was born to working class teenage parents: a part-time secretary and an apprentice carpenter. Her mother was killed in a car crash in 1989.

Having been awarded a scholarship, she was educated at MLC School, an independent day school for girls in Burwood, New South Wales. She then took the degrees of Bachelor of Agricultural Science (BAgrSc Hons) at the University of Sydney, Bachelor of Arts (BA Hons) in Asian Studies at the University of New England and Master of Arts (MA) in Mass Communication from the University of Leicester, graduating from the latter in 2001. She was the first member of her family to attend university.

Journalism career
Bennett began her career in journalism in New South Wales, where she worked for various regional newspapers including the Northern Daily Leader in Tamworth. She left Australia in 1995, and lived for four years in Thailand where she worked for Australian Volunteers International in the Office of the National Commission of Women's Affairs, before moving to the Bangkok Post newspaper, where she was chief foreign sub-editor.

She settled in the United Kingdom in 1999, and said in a 2013 interview for the Australian Inside Story website about the country of her birth: "I can’t imagine going there by choice." In Britain, Bennett has written for The Guardians "Comment is Free" section since 2006. Bennett was also a blogger. She was deputy editor and then editor of The Guardian Weekly from December 2007 until March 2012. She has also worked for the London-based Independent and Times newspapers. In 2012, she took voluntary redundancy and left journalism.

Political career
Natalie Bennett joined the Green Party on 1 January 2006. Later the same year she stood for the Greens in the Camden Council election in the Regent's Park ward and again in the Camden Council election of 2010 in the Somers Town ward, but was not elected on either occasion. She was the internal communications coordinator on the national executive of the party from September 2007 to August 2011.

In January 2010, she was selected to stand for the Parliamentary seat of Holborn and St Pancras. She came fourth with 2.7% of the vote. She stood next in the London Assembly elections of 2012, as the fourth placed candidate on the London-wide list for the Green Party.

Green Party leader
On 3 September 2012, Bennett replaced Caroline Lucas as leader of the Green Party of England and Wales. 3,127 ballot papers were returned in the 2012 Green Party leadership elections, a turnout of 25.1%. This turnout was explained by Bennett in a BBC interview: "if you hold an election in the month of August you kind of expect that turnout won't be particularly high". On election as party leader Bennett told a press conference that the policies of the Green Party were "the only viable way forward for British people, for the world".

In May 2014 she was selected again to contest the Parliamentary seat of Holborn and St Pancras. She was re-elected unopposed as leader of the party in September 2014.

In February 2015, an interview with Bennett regarding the funding of house-building on the talk radio station LBC was described by her as "absolutely excruciating". In a halting interview on LBC in which she struggled to explain how her party would pay for 500,000 new council homes it is pledging to build. She told Nick Ferrari the policy would cost £2.7bn, prompting the presenter to ask: “Five hundred thousand homes – £2.7bn? What are they made of – plywood?”

In January 2015 Ofcom ruled to exclude the Green Party from the televised debates surrounding the 2015 election, on the grounds that the party had not demonstrated "significant past electoral support in General Elections". Bennett called the ruling  "disgraceful and indefensible" and David Cameron claimed that he was "quite happy for there to be no debates at all" if the Green Party was not included. This decision was later reversed, after which the Green Party's support increased again. The seven-way debate ultimately took place on 2 April, with Bennett present.

Bennett came third in the election to the Labour and Conservative candidates, and in 2016, at the end of her second two-year term, did not stand for re-election as leader. At the party's 2016 autumn conference in Birmingham, Lucas and Jonathan Bartley were elected as co-leaders of the party in a job-share arrangement.

2017 UK general election
On 7 October 2016, it was announced that Bennett had been selected to contest the Sheffield Central constituency for the Green Party in the 2017 UK general election. Bennett's candidacy saw a drop of 7.8% in the share of Green votes as well as a drop in its position from second to third (out of eight candidates) with 3,848 votes.

House of Lords
Bennett was nominated for a life peerage in September 2019, and was created Baroness Bennett of Manor Castle on 7 October 2019. She becomes the Green Party of England and Wales' second current member of the House of Lords, joining Jenny Jones, Baroness Jones of Moulsecoomb. She was introduced to the Lords on 15 October 2019 by Baroness Jones of Moulsecoomb and John Bird, Baron Bird, and made her maiden speech on 17 October 2019.

Electoral performance

Local Government

House of Commons

Political positions

Bennett has considered herself a feminist since she was a young child, claiming that it was her "first politics". She also founded the Green Party women's group and was a trustee of the Fawcett Society between 2010 and 2014. She became interested in environmental issues when she obtained a degree in Agricultural Sciences. She is in favour of abolishing the monarchy. In an April 2015 interview, she said that she supports the Green Party policy of an economic and cultural boycott of Israel, and also thought that Britain should cease arms sales to Saudi Arabia. She has also voiced support for polygamy and polyamorous relationships.

Personal life
Baroness Bennett is single and lives in Sheffield. During her time as leader her partner was Jim Jepps, a left-wing activist who was a member of the Socialist Workers Party (SWP) for approximately a decade before leaving it around 2003.

Bibliography
Editor, Thailand Country Study: Best Practice Guide on Sustainable Action Against Child Labour (1998) 
Editor, Women's Health and Development, Country Profile Thailand

References

External links

 

|-

1966 births
Living people
Journalists from Sydney
Politicians from Sydney
Alumni of the University of Leicester
Australian emigrants to England
Australian feminists
Australian life peers
Australian newspaper editors
British feminists
British journalists
British newspaper editors
British republicans
British social commentators
Green Party of England and Wales life peers
Green Party of England and Wales parliamentary candidates
Leaders of political parties in the United Kingdom
People educated at MLC School
People from Somers Town, London
University of New England (Australia) alumni
University of Sydney alumni
The Guardian journalists
The Independent people
The Times people
Women newspaper editors
Life peeresses created by Elizabeth II